The first evidence for whaling in Scotland is from Bronze Age settlements where whalebones were used for constructing and decorating dwelling places. Commercial whaling started in the Middle Ages, and by the 1750s most Scottish ports were whaling, with the Edinburgh Whale-Fishing Company being founded in 1749. The last company still engaged in whaling was Christian Salvesen, which exited the industry in 1963.

History
In the 19th century Arctic bowhead whaling, conducted from ports right along the east coast of the country, was vital for the Scottish jute industry, especially for processing jute fibre in Dundee. Whale oil was also used for street lighting. The two main Scottish ports were Dundee and Peterhead. Greenock was the only significant whaling port on the west coast.

Whaling was also conducted on the west coast. A station at Bun Abhainn Eadarra near Tarbert in the Outer Hebrides was founded by the Norwegian Karl Herlofsen in 1904. Later acquired by Lever Brothers it was abandoned by them in 1929. Operations continued under new owners but it finally closed in 1951. Little remains to be seen of the site except the incongruous red brick chimney.

The Scottish whaling industry rapidly declined at the beginning of the 20th century, and ended completely in 1963 when Edinburgh-based Christian Salvesen, once the largest whaling company in the world, withdrew from the industry and sold its last two whaling vessels.

Although whaling in now considered to be a controversial trade, for many centuries it was a vital element of the Scottish economy.

Pioneering role of Scottish whalers in Antarctic exploration

The first known photographs of Antarctica were taken during the Scottish whaling expedition of 1892-93. A Dundee whaling fleet, with scientific officers on board, visited the Falkland Islands, the Joinville Island group and the northern Trinity Peninsula. Captain Robertson discovered and charted Active Sound and the Firth of Tay. The fleet encountered Carl Anton Larsen of the Jason, near Joinville Island, on 24 December 1892. Four ships took part:
Thomas Robertson, Active, with Charles W. Donald
Alexander Fairweather, Balaena, with William Speirs Bruce and William Gordon Burn Murdoch
Robert Davidson, Diana
James Davidson, Polar Star
The success of the 1892-93 expedition led directly to the Scottish National Antarctic Expedition of 1902–04, and to Dundee being chosen for building the Discovery for the Discovery Expedition of 1901–04.

Scottish place names in Antarctica

Due to the work of Scottish whalers, sealers and other sailors, several place names in or near Antarctica have Scottish origins:
 Anderson Peninsula
 Coats Land, named for the brothers James and Andrew Coats of J and P Coats, Glasgow, who funded the Scottish National Antarctic Expedition
 Dundee Island and Firth of Tay
 Inverleith Harbour
 McDonald Ice Rumples
 McMurdo Sound, McMurdo Ice Shelf & McMurdo Station
 McIntyre Island
 MacKenzie Bay
 Mount Campbell
 Mount Crawford (Antarctica)
 Mount Dalrymple
 Mount Douglas (Antarctica)
 Mount Hamilton (Antarctica)
 Mount Inverleith
 Mount Kirkpatrick/Kilpatrick & Kirkpatrick Basalt (named for a Glasgow businessman)
 Mount Strathcona
 Robertson Island
 Robertson Islands
 Scotia Arc & Scotia Sea
 Trinity Peninsula, etymology unknown, but may be named after Trinity House in Leith, Scotland's centre for maritime administration
 Weddell Sea, named in 1822 after the Scottish sealer James Weddell
 Falkland Islands, from Falkland Sound, named for Anthony Cary, 5th Viscount of Falkland, who in turn took his title from Falkland Palace in Fife. See also West Falkland & East Falkland, the two main islands.
 Douglas
 Brenton Loch (inlet) and Loch Head Pond are rare examples of the Scottish word 'loch' being applied to bodies of water outwith Scotland
 South Orkneys
 Ailsa Craig
 Cape Geddes
 Laurie Island (named by Scottish National Antarctic Expedition)
 Nigg Rock 
 Orcadas Base
 Omond House 
 Scotia Bay
 South Shetlands
 Barclay Bay
 Duff Point
 Gibbs Island
 Livingston Island, McFarlane Strait (Livingston)
 McFarlane Strait
 Morton Strait
 South Shetland Trough

See also
 Fishing in Scotland
 Murray's Bay, Robben Island, South Africa; in 1806 the Scottish whaler John Murray opened a whaling station at a sheltered bay on the north-eastern shore of the island which became known as Murray's Bay, adjacent to the site of the present-day harbour named Murray's Bay Harbour which was constructed in 1939–40 (see Scottish placenames in South Africa).
 Olna Firth, Shetland
 Tay Whale
 The Famous Tay Whale, a poem by William Topaz McGonagall
 John Sen Inches Thomson
 Whaling in the United Kingdom

References